Pope Pius IX (r. 1846–1878) created 123 cardinals in 23 consistories.

21 December 1846
Pius created four cardinals at his first consistory, two of them in pectore.
 Gaetano Baluffi (1788–1866)
 Raffaele Fornari (1787–1854), in pectore, announced 30 September 1850
 Pietro Marini (1794–1863)
 Giuseppe Bofondi (1795–1867), in pectore, announced 11 June 1847

11 June 1847

 Pierre Giraud (1791–1850)
 Jacques-Marie-Antoine-Célestin Dupont (1792–1859)
 Giacomo Antonelli (1806–1876)

17 January 1848

 Carlo Vizzardelli (1791–1851)

30 September 1850

 Paul-Thérèse-David d'Astros (1772–1851)
 Juan José Bonel y Orbe (1782–1857)
 Giuseppe Cosenza (1788–1863)
 Jacques-Marie-Adrien-Césaire Mathieu (1796–1875)
 Judas José Romo y Gamboa (1779–1855)
 Thomas-Marie-Joseph Gousset (1792–1866)
 Maximilian Joseph Gottfried Sommerau Beeckh (1769–1853)
 Johannes von Geissel (1796–1864)
 Pedro Paulo de Figueiredo da Cunha e Melo (1770–1855)
 Nicholas Wiseman (1802–1865)
 Giuseppe Pecci (1776–1855)
 Melchior von Diepenbrock (1798–1853)
 Roberto Giovanni F. Roberti (1788–1867)

15 March 1852

 Domenico Lucciardi (1796–1864)
 Ferdinand-François-Auguste Donnet (1795–1882)
 Gerolamo Marquese d'Andrea (1812–1868)
 Carlo Luigi Morichini (1805–1879)
 Michele Viale-Prelà (1798–1860)
 Giovanni Brunelli (1795–1861)

7 March 1853

 János Scitovszky (1785–1866)
 François-Nicholas-Madeleine Morlot (1795–1862)
 Giusto Recanati (1789–1861)
 Domenico Savelli (1792–1864)
 Prospero Caterini (1795–1881)
 Vincenzo Santucci (1796–1861)

19 December 1853

 Gioacchino Pecci (1810–1903) - Elected Pope Leo XIII (1878–1903)
 Camillo di Pietro (1806–1884)

17 December 1855

 Joseph Othmar Rauscher (1797–1875)
 Karl-August von Reisach (1800–1869)
 Clément Villecourt (1787–1867)
 Francesco Gaude (1809–1860)

16 June 1856

 Mykhajlo Levitsky (1774–1858)
 Juraj Haulik (1788–1869)
 Alessandro Barnabò (1801–1874)
 Gaspare Grassellini (1796–1875)
 Francesco de' Medici di Ottaiano (1808–1857)

15 March 1858

 Cirilo de Alameda y Brea (1781–1872)
 Antonio Benedetto Antonucci (1798–1879)
 Manuel Joaquín Tarancón y Morón (1782–1862)
 Enrico Orfei (1800–1870)
 Giuseppe Milesi Pironi Ferretti (1817–1873)
 Pietro de Silvestri (1803–1875)
 Teodolfo Mertel (1806–1899)

25 June 1858

 Manuel Bento Rodrigues da Silva (1800–1869)

27 September 1861

 Alexis Billiet (1783–1873)
 Carlo Sacconi (1808–1889)
 Miguel García Cuesta (1803–1873)
 Gaetano Bedini (1806–1864)
 Fernando de la Puente y Primo de Rivera (1808–1867)
 Angelo Quaglia (1802–1872)
 Antonio Maria Panebianco (1808–1885)

16 March 1863

 Giuseppe Luigi Trevisanato (1801–1877)
 Antonio Saverio De Luca (1805–1883)
 Giuseppe Andrea Bizzarri (1802–1877)
 Luis de la Lastra y Cuesta (1803–1876)
 Jean Baptiste François Pitra (1812–1889)
 Filippo Maria Guidi (1815–1879)
 Francesco Pentini (1797–1869)

11 December 1863

 Henri-Marie-Gaston Boisnormand de Bonnechose (1800–1883)

22 June 1866

 Paul Cullen (1803–1878)
 Gustav Adolf Hohenlohe (1823–1896)
 Luigi Bilio (1826–1884)
 Antonio Matteucci (1802–1866)
 Domenico Consolini (1806–1884)

13 March 1868

 Lucien Louis Joseph Napoleon Bonaparte (1828–1895)
 Innocenzo Ferrieri (1810–1887)
 Matteo Eustachio Gonella (1811–1870)
 Lorenzo Barili (1801–1875)
 Giuseppe Berardi (1810–1878)
 Juan de la Cruz Ignacio Moreno y Maisonave (1817–1884)
 Raffaele Monaco La Valletta (1827–1896)
 Edoardo Borromeo (1822–1881)
 Annibale Capalti (1811–1877)

22 December 1873

 Inácio do Nascimento de Morais Cardoso (1811–1883)
 René-François Régnier (1794–1881)
 Maximilian Joseph von Tarnóczy (1806–1876)
 Flavio Chigi (1810–1885)
 Alessandro Franchi (1819–1878)
 Joseph-Hippolyte Guibert (1802–1886)
 Mariano Falcinelli Antoniacci (1806–1874)
 Mariano Benito Barrio y Fernández (1805–1876)
 Luigi Oreglia di Santo Stefano (1828–1913)
 János Simor (1813–1891)
 Camillo Tarquini (1810–1874)
 Tommaso Martinelli (1827–1888)

15 March 1875
Pius created eleven cardinals in his March 1875 consistory, reserving the names of five of them in pectore.
 Ruggero Luigi Emidio Antici Mattei (1811–1883)
 Pietro Gianelli (1807–1881)
 Mieczysław Halka Ledóchowski (1822–1902)
 John McCloskey (1810–1885)
 Henry Edward Manning (1808–1892)
 Victor-Auguste-Isidor Deschamps (1810–1883)
 Salvatore Nobili Vitelleschi (1818–1875)
 Giovanni Simeoni (1816–1892)
 Domenico Bartolini (1813–1887)
 Lorenzo Ilarione Randi (1818–1887)
 Bartolomeo Pacca, iuniore (1817–1880)

17 September 1875

 Godefroy Brossais-Saint-Marc (1803–1878)

3 April 1876

 Bartolomeo D’Avanzo (1811–1884)
 Johannes Baptist Franzelin (1816–1886)

12 March 1877

 Francisco de Paula Benavides y Navarrete (1810–1895)
 Francesco Saverio Apuzzo (1807–1880)
 Manuel García Gil (1802–1881)
 Edward Henry Howard (1829–1892)
 Miguel Payá y Rico (1811–1891)
 Louis-Marie Caverot (1806–1887)
 Luigi di Canossa (1809–1900)
 Luigi Serafini (1808–1894)
 Lorenzo Nina (1812–1885)
 Enea Sbarretti (1808–1884)
 Frédéric de Falloux du Coudray (1815–1884)

22 June 1877

 Josip Mihalovic (1814–1891)
 Johann Rudolf Kutschker (1810–1881)
 Lucido Parocchi (1833–1903)

28 December 1877

 Vincenzo Moretti (1815–1881)
 Antonio Pellegrini (1812–1887)

References

Additional sources
  

Pius 9
Pope Pius IX
19th-century Catholicism
College of Cardinals
 
Cardinals created by Pope Pius IX